Alex Beard may refer to:

 Alex Beard (artist) (born 1970), American artist
 Alex Beard (arts manager) (born 1963), chief executive of the Royal Opera House
 Alex Beard (businessman) (born 1967), British billionaire businessman